Light Asylum is a Brooklyn-based electronic music duo consisting of Shannon Funchess and Bruno Coviello. The band released their first EP In Tension in 2010. The four track EP was re-released in 2011 through indie label Mexican Summer. Their self-titled début album was released in May 2012. It received generally positive reviews from Pitchfork, FACT, Mixmag, NME, XLR8R and The Quietus.

History
In 2003, Bruno Coviello wrote an electroclash/dance-pop song for the Party Monster soundtrack under the alias Mannequin. Shannon Funchess had provided vocals for acts such as TV on the Radio, !!! and Telepathe. Funchess also collaborated with The Knife on the track "Stay Out Here" from the band's fourth album Shaking the Habitual in 2013.

Light Asylum's music is heavily influenced by 1980s music. Their style incorporates elements of darkwave, synthpop and post-punk music, and The Guardian compared Light Asylum to Nine Inch Nails and Depeche Mode.

Light Asylum's song Dark Allies was used as the theme song of the 2019 podcast The Ballad of Billy Balls.

Discography

Studio albums
 Light Asylum (2012)

Extended plays
 In Tension (2010)

Singles
 "Shallow Tears" (2012)
 "Heart of Dust" (2012)
 "A Certain Person" (2012)

References

External links 
 

Electronic music groups from New York (state)
American dark wave musical groups
Musical groups from Brooklyn